Ilam County is in Ilam province, Iran. The capital of the county is the city of Ilam. At the 2006 census, the county's population was 193,222 in 42,207 households. The following census in 2011 counted 213,579 people in 52,391 households. At the 2016 census, the county's population was 235,144 in 64,671 households. After the census, Chavar District was elevated to the status of Chavar County.

Administrative divisions

The population history and structural changes of Ilam County's administrative divisions over three consecutive censuses are shown in the following table. The latest census shows three districts, six rural districts, and two cities.

See also
Chavar County

References

 

Counties of Ilam Province